Wallas Eaton (18 February 1917 – 3 November 1995), sometimes credited as Wallace Eaton or Wallis Eaton, was an English film, radio, television and theatre actor.

He is perhaps best remembered for his voice roles between 1949 and 1960 in the BBC radio-comedy serial Take It from Here.

Early life
Eaton was born in Leicester, Leicestershire, England. He was educated at the Alderman Newton School, and later would read History and English at Christ's College, Cambridge. Eaton joined the Army in 1940, and served with distinction during World War II, eventually becoming a major in charge of a searchlight battery.

Acting career
His first stage appearance was at the Theatre Royal in his home town of Leicester in 1936. Three years later he made his London debut playing the small part of the Announcer in Auden and Isherwood's The Ascent of F6 at the Old Vic. The following year Eaton played the Second Priest in Eliot's Murder in the Cathedral in 1940 and he followed this with what was his first comedy role, in The Body Was Well Nourished by Sidney Gilliat and Frank Launder.

In 1944, he appeared in Shaw's Too True To Be Good at the Lyric Theatre, Hammersmith. Eaton enjoyed a series of good, if small, roles, appearing alongside Vivien Leigh at the Phoenix Theatre in 1945 in Thornton Wilder's  The Skin of Our Teeth. In films, Eaton had a role in Caesar and Cleopatra (1945).

In addition to working on the long-running BBC radio comedy Take It from Here, Eaton appeared in more than twenty-five films and over fifty television productions. His debut for BBC Television was in Arthur Askey's top- rated series Before Your Very Eyes in 1952, and he had parts in the Frankie Howerd series Up Pompeii and The Rivals of Sherlock Holmes. 

Eaton's favourite pastime was sailing, and he made a trip to Australia in 1975 to pursue his interest, after which he settled there permanently. He featured in the Australian soap  The Young Doctors in 1979 as Roland Perry, a rich friend of principal character Ada Simmonds. He also made a few appearances in later episodes of the television drama serial A Country Practice.

Personal life
He died in Australia in November 1995, aged 78.

Partial filmography

 Dual Alibi (1947) - Court Official (uncredited)
 A Man's Affair (1949) - Leonard
 Dark Interval (1950)
 Up for the Cup (1950) - Barrowboy
 Chelsea Story (1951) - Danny
 Adventure in the Hopfields (1954) - Junk Shop Owner
 Alive on Saturday (1957) - Garton
 Two-Way Stretch (1960) - Gate Warder (Night)
 Operation Cupid (1960) - Cecil
 This Sporting Life (1963) - Waiter
 Inspector Clouseau (1968) - Hoeffler
 Isadora (1968) - Archer
 Lock Up Your Daughters (1969) - Staff 
 O Lucky Man! (1973) - John Stone (Coffee Factory) / Col. Steiger / Prison Warder / Meths Drinker / Film Executive
 Mad Dog Morgan (1976) - Macpherson
 Deathcheaters (1976) - 2nd Police Sergeant
 The Last Wave (1977) - Morgue Doctor
 Save the Lady (1982) - Trotter
 Goodbye Paradise (1983) - Clyde
 Undercover (1984) - Mr. Breedlove
 Annie's Coming Out (1984) - Dr. Rowell 
 The Pickwick Papers (1985) - Voice
 Kidnapped (1986) - Voice
 Outback (1989) - Grassmore

References

External links

 Palmer, Howard (10 August 1965) "Hilarious Night". The Age (via Google News). Accessed 2015-09-19.

1917 births
1995 deaths
English expatriates in Australia
English male film actors
English male radio actors
English male stage actors
English male television actors
People from Leicester
Male actors from Leicestershire
20th-century English male actors
British Army personnel of World War II
Royal Artillery officers
Military personnel from Leicester